The 2018–19 NCAA Division I women's ice hockey season began in September 2018 and ended with the 2019 NCAA Division I women's ice hockey tournament's championship game on March 24, 2019.

Polls

Regular season

Standings

Player stats

Scoring leaders
The following players lead the NCAA in points at the conclusion of games played on March 23, 2019.

Leading goaltenders
The following goaltenders lead the NCAA in goals against average.

GP = Games played; Min = Minutes played; W = Wins; L = Losses; T = Ties; GA = Goals against; SO = Shutouts; SV% = Save percentage; GAA = Goals against average

Awards

WCHA

CHA

WHEA

ECAC

Patty Kazmaier Award

AHCA Coach of the Year

Women's Hockey Commissioners Association
Grace Harrison: Women's Hockey Commissioners Association Division I Goaltender of the Month for January 2019

References

2018–19 NCAA Division I women's hockey season
NCAA
NCAA Division I women's ice hockey seasons